Georg Christian Sibbern (29 March 1816 – 4 October 1901) was a Norwegian diplomat who served as the prime minister of Norway.

Background
He was born at Rygge in Østfold. He was the son of Valentin Sibbern (1779–1853) and Anne Cathrine de Stockfleth (1785–1865) and a brother of Alette Due and Carl Sibbern. His father was a Norwegian government minister and was a representative at the Norwegian Constitutional Assembly. He grow up at the family estate at Værne Kloster. He attended the Oslo Cathedral School. He completed his examen artium at Oslo Cathedral School in 1831, and graduated in law at the University of Christiania (now University of Oslo) in 1837.

Career
From 1838 he worked as an agent by the Norwegian Minister Department in Stockholm and from 1840 was employed in the foreign service. He worked in St. Petersburg (1842–1843), Copenhagen (1845-1847), The Hague (1847–1848), London (1848–1850) and Washington, D.C. (1850–1856). In April 1858, Sibbern was appointed Swedish-Norwegian ambassador in Constantinople. He served as Norwegian Prime Minister from 16 December 1858 – 30 November 1861 and 17 December 1861 – 1 November 1871. He later was ambassador in Paris (1878–1884).

Personal life
On 20 November 1852, he married Maria Soane. He was the brother-in-law of Frederik Due.

References

1816 births
1901 deaths
Government ministers of Norway
19th-century Norwegian politicians
University of Oslo alumni
People educated at Oslo Cathedral School
Ambassadors of Sweden to the United States
Ambassadors of Sweden to Turkey
Ambassadors of Sweden to France
People from Rygge